= Adraspalle =

- Village
- Location in Telangana, India Adraspalle (India)
- Coordinates: 17°37′08″N 78°39′45″E
- Country: India
- State: Telangana

Languages
  - Official: Telugu
- Time zone: UTC+5:30 (IST)
- Telephone code: 040
- Vehicle registration: TS-26 X XXXX
- Sex ratio: 1:1(approx) ♂/♀
- Website: telangana.gov.in

Adraspalle is a village in Ranga Reddy district, in Telangana, India. The total population of Adraspalle is approximately 2000.
